Dean Anthony Smith (born 15 May 1969) is an Australian politician and Liberal Party member of the Australian Senate since 2012, representing Western Australia.

Early life
Smith attended Mirrabooka Primary School and Mirrabooka Senior High School, later attending the University of Western  Australia  where he  graduated  with  honours  in  political  science.

Politics
Smith joined the Liberal Party at the age of 17, and later worked as a policy adviser to Premier of Western Australia Richard Court. In 1998, he was a senior advisor to Prime Minister John Howard during the Coalition's 1998 federal election campaign. In 2010, he founded Smith & Duda Consulting, a political lobbying firm, and also served as treasurer of the Liberal Party state branch in Western Australia.

Senate
Smith was appointed to the Senate on 2 May 2012 by a joint sitting of the Parliament of Western Australia, to fill a casual vacancy caused by the death of Senator Judith Adams.

Smith was the first openly-LGBTI member of the Parliament of Australia from the Liberal Party, and has supported same-sex marriage in Australia since the 2014 Sydney hostage crisis. Prior to that, he opposed same-sex marriage and voted against it.  Smith introduced the Marriage Amendment (Definition and Religious Freedoms) Bill 2017 to the Senate on 15 November and passed the Senate on 29 November 2017.

Smith was appointed Chief Government Whip in the Senate on 21 January 2019.

He served on the "Inquiry into the destruction of 46,000 year old caves at the Juukan Gorge in the Pilbara region of Western Australia", which delivered its interim report in December 2020. He co-authored additional dissenting comments to the Inquiry's final report with George Christensen MP, arguing against the report's recommendation for new Commonwealth heritage legislation because the "duplication of cultural heritage protection laws at a Federal level is not supported by peak [mining] industry bodies."

Smith is a member of a number of political and community organisations, including Australians for Constitutional Monarchy and the Australian National Flag Association.

Personal life 
Smith is the son of a policeman and housewife and is originally from Mirrabooka. He was the first person in his family to attend university. He is an Anglican.

References

External links

 Official website
 Summary of parliamentary voting for Senator Dean Smith on TheyVoteForYou.org.au

1969 births
Living people
Australian monarchists
Australian political consultants
Gay politicians
LGBT conservatism
LGBT legislators in Australia
Australian LGBT rights activists
Liberal Party of Australia members of the Parliament of Australia
Members of the Australian Senate for Western Australia
Members of the Australian Senate
Politicians from Perth, Western Australia
Turnbull Government
University of Western Australia alumni
21st-century Australian politicians
21st-century LGBT people